Art International Radio was an online, non-profit cultural Internet radio station that was also home to the Clocktower Gallery, an historic New York City alternative exhibition space.  Art International Radio was directed by Alanna Heiss, the founder and former Director of P.S.1 Contemporary Art Center in Long Island City, Queens. In December 2013, after 40 years of operation from its historic 1894 McKim, Mead & White building in Lower Manhattan, the Clocktower announced its final exhibition and plans for relocation through a year of creative collaborations with partner organizations all over New York City.

Mission and operation

Art International Radio was launched as AIR, Art International Radio on January 1, 2009 after negotiations with the former resident, P.S.1 Contemporary Art Center (which operated its own Internet radio station WPS1.org), and a transfer of the space, equipment, staff, and content was achieved. The non-profit AIR is licensed by the New York City Department of Cultural Affairs in the legendary Clocktower Gallery spaces, which AIR Director Alanna Heiss has occupied since 1972.

Art International Radio's programming is anchored in thousands of hours of cultural content still available free on-demand online at www.clocktower.org. The archive contains the entire production output of the former WPS1.org, discontinued last year. Programs include new music, spoken word, theatre and discussions on a variety of topics recorded both in-studio and offsite from art events worldwide such as Art Basel Miami Beach and the Venice Biennale. Art International Radio also engaged in organizational collaborations by recording, editing and archiving public programs from diverse cultural groups, galleries, museums, and performing art centers.

In parallel with the radio project, the gallery spaces were used for artists’ projects, workshops, community events, and residencies. In June 2009, installations and artworks commissioned by AIR went on view in the galleries and project spaces. Works by Tony Oursler, Todd Eberle, Mary Heilmann and Sabina Streeter reinaugurated the Clocktower Gallery's exhibition program. In June 2010, the second exhibition at AIR's Clocktower Gallery opened; entitled The Dangerous Book Four Boys, it was the first solo exhibition of the work of actor and artist James Franco.

Clocktower Gallery

In the 1970s, Alanna Heiss became an important and articulate champion of the alternative space movement. She founded The Institute for Art and Urban Resources in 1971, which was devoted to creating installations in otherwise unused or overlooked spaces in New York. The Institute's first pioneering exhibition, Under the Brooklyn Bridge, featured such artists as Carl Andre, Philip Glass, and Sol LeWitt, and was organized by Heiss with the help of the Post-Minimalist sculptor Gordon Matta Clark. In 1972, under the aegis of this organization, she created the Clocktower Gallery, located on the 13th Floor of a 19th-century city-owned McKim, Mead & White building, on Leonard Street and Broadway in Lower Manhattan, New York.

After September 11, 2001, security procedures in this city-owned building suspended ongoing activity and exhibitions in the Clocktower. In 2004, the space became the headquarters of P.S.1 Contemporary Art Center’s Web radio station, Art Radio WPS1.org.

Since WPS1.org’s discontinuation in December 2008, the Clocktower Gallery space became home to the offices, recording studios, and gallery spaces of AIR, Art International Radio. The Clocktower Gallery has been host to two exhibitions since its 2009 re-inauguration as an exhibition space (see above).

Staff

AIR was directed by founder and former director of P.S.1 Contemporary Art Center Alanna Heiss and a staff that included several former P.S.1 employees who were directly involved in the museum’s public programs, exhibitions, and radio station. Managing Director David Weinstein was Director of Public Programs at P.S.1 and led the curatorial team that assembled the summer Warm Up music series there; Jeannie Hopper is a longtime radio personality and DJ at WBAI-FM who took on the role of Station Manager; and Beatrice Johnson brought curatorial expertise from P.S.1 as AIR’s Program Manager.

Building history 

Built 1894–1898, the Clock Tower Office Building, also known as the Former New York Life Insurance Company Building was originally the home office of the New York Life Insurance Company, until the company’s relocation to Madison Square in 1927. The Clock Tower continued to be used as an office building, housing some City agencies as early as 1939. The City bought the building in 1967 and moved the New York City Criminal Court, Summons Part there, along with several City agencies.

McKim, Mead & White's Broadway frontage is a flamboyant palazzo-like pavilion crowned by a clock tower. The building retains many of New York Life's original interior spaces, including a marble lobby, a 13-story stair hall, a banking hall, executive offices, and the clock tower machinery room.

The Clock Tower Building is a designated New York City Landmark, with both the exterior and parts of the interior landmarked. It is also on the New York State and National Registers of Historic Places.

References

External links
Clocktower Productions (formerly The Clocktower Gallery & ARTonAIR.org)
MoMA PS1 (formerly P.S.1 Contemporary Art Center)
Managed Public Buildings, Clock Tower

Internet radio stations in the United States
Radio stations established in 2009
Radio stations disestablished in 2013
Defunct radio stations in the United States
Defunct mass media in New York (state)